A Quinta: O Desafio (English: The Farm: The Challenge) is the first season of the all-stars format and the fourth overall of the Portuguese version of the reality show The Farm, which was broadcast by TVI. The season was announced at the finale of the last season, and it's a reality all-stars since it'll have a mix of A Quinta and Secret Story contestants, making "A Voz" a comeback for this season since the last time which was on Luta Pelo Poder. The season premiered on January 3, and the host is Teresa Guilherme once again. Like last season, the 24-hour channel TVI Reality will be an exclusive of NOS, where is broadcast the nominations show at Tuesdays.

Contestants 
The contestants of A Quinta: O Desafio will be a mix of A Quinta and Secret Story contestants, who will battle to see who's the best of the bests.

Nominations table

Notes
 :  Érica and Joana are immune for this nominations.
 : The first nominations of the show, were done face-to-face. For the first round, everyone nominated females. Cristiana received the most nominations and is the first nominee. For the second round, males nominated females. Liliana A. received the most nominations and is the second nominee. For the third round, females nominated females. Angélica and Elisabete received the most nominations and are the last nominees. As a leader, António could save one of the nominees. He saved Elisabete. The public vote is to evict.
 :  Tiago is immune and exempt for this nominations, as a new contestant.
 : Nominations were done face-to-face this week. For the first round, the members of Team Teresa nominated the members of Team Voz. There was a tie between Pedro C. and Bernardina. Bernardina received the most nominations in a tiebreaker and is the first nominee. For the second round, the members of Team Voz nominated members of Team Teresa. Larama received the most nominations and is the second nominee. For the third round, everyone nominated males. Bruno received the most nominations and is the third nominee. For the fourth round, everyone nominated females. There was a tie between Angélica, Liliana A. and Joana. In the tiebreaker Liliana A.  and Joana received the most nominations and was done another tiebreaker. Joana received the most nominations and is the fourth nominee. The public vote is to save.
 :  Diogo and Juliana are immune and exempt for this nominations, as a new contestants.
 : The nominations were done face-to-face, and in all the rounds the contestants nominated the members of Team Voz. For the first round, Team Teresa nominated. There was a tie between Bernardina, Bruno, Daniel, Jéssica and Pedro C. As a leader, António broke the tie and Daniel is the first nominee. For the second round, Team Voz nominated. There was a tie between Liliana A. and Elisabete. As a leader, António broke the tie and Liliana A. is the second nominee. For the third round, everyone nominated. Pedro C. received the most nominations and is the third nominee. The public vote is to save.
 :  Bruno, Larama and Pedro B. were nominated by "A Voz" on day 19 because them disregard the rules of the farm. Daniel and Liliana A. still nominated after Pedro C.'s ejection. Afterwards Bruno was also ejected after attacking his housemates and his girlfriend Elisabete decided to go with him, leaving Daniel, Larama, Liliana A. and Pedro B. as this week's nominees.
 :  Rúben, Tatiana and Luís are immune and exempt for this nominations, as a new contestants.
 :  Érica was nominated by "A Voz", after aggression to Diogo.
 : The nominations were done face-to-face. For the first round, the members of Team Voz nominated members of Team Teresa. Tiago received the most nominations and is the first nominee. For the second round, members of Team Teresa nominated members of Team Voz. Juliana received the most nominations and is the second nominee. For the third round, everyone nominated everyone. Carlos received the most nominations and is the third nominee. The public vote is to save.
 :  António was immune and exempt to nominate as he became a contestant on Day 29.
 : The nominations were done face-to-face, and in each round there was three nominees. For the first round, everyone nominated everyone. Diogo, Luís and Tiago received the most nominations and are the first nominees. For the second round, everyone nominated everyone again. Tatiana received the most nominations and there was a tie between Bernardina, Carlos and Rúben. After the tiebreaker, Carlos and Rúben joined Tatiana and are the last nominees. There were also a voting to save two of the nominees (Carlos, Diogo, Luís, Rúben, Tiago and Tatiana). Diogo and Carlos were saved and the Week 5's nominees are Luís, Rúben, Tiago and Tatiana. The public vote is to save.
 : The nominations were done face-to-face. For the first round, the members of Team Teresa nominated the members of Team Voz. Tatiana received the most nominations and is the first nominee. For the second round, the members of Team Voz nominated the members of Team Teresa. António received the most nominations and is the second nominee. For the third round, everyone nominated the members of Team Voz. Juliana received the most nominations and is the third nominee. For the fourth round, everyone nominated the members of Team Teresa. There was a tie between Carlos, Luís Tiago. In a tiebreaker, Tiago received the most nominations and is the fourth nominee.
 : The first round of this nominations was done in the Diary Room and everyone nominated one male and one female (names in bold). António and Bernardina received the most nominations and are the first nominees. The second round of this nominations was done face-to-face and everyone nominated one male and one female. Tiago and Liliana A. received the most nominations and are the last nominees.
 : The first round of this nominations was done in the Diary Room and everyone nominated one male and one female (names in bold). Tatiana received the most nominations and Carlos was nominated in a tiebreaker (between Luís), and they are the first nominees. The second round of this nominations was done face-to-face and everyone nominated one male. Daniel received the most nominations and is the last nominee.
 :  Agnes was immune and exempt to nominate as she became a contestant on Day 59.
 : The first round of this nominations was done in the Diary Room and everyone nominated one male. Luís received the most nominations and is the first nominee. The second round of this nominations was done face-to-face and everyone nominated one male. Tiago received the most nominations and is the second nominee. The third round of this nominations was also done face-to-face and everyone saved one male non-nominated: Daniel or Carlos (names in bold). Carlos received the fewest votes and is the third nominee.
 :  On Day 64, "A Voz" gave a dilemma to Bernardina: to win  immunity she had to eject the guest Angélica. She decided to eject Angélica and be immune.
 :  On Day 64, "A Voz" gave a dilemma to Daniel and Liliana A.: they had to decide which of them will be automatically nominated. Daniel decided to be nominated.
 : This nominations were done in the Diary Room and everyone nominated two contestants. Agnes, Luís and Tiago received the most nominations and are the  nominees with Daniel.
 :  On Day 71, Daniel received a pass to the final as he won a game.
 :  Everyone is automatically nominated exempt Daniel, who won a pass to the finale.
 : The public voted for who they wanted to win.

Nominations total received

Nominations: Results

Team of the farm

Twists

Leaders 
Like last season, some guests entered the farm to take the place of leader and boss, instructing the contestants on their daily works.

Final Prize 
The final prize for the winner is €20,000, the same value of the A Quinta. However, if contestants disregard the rules, a certain amount will be removed from the final prize, or else, go up if the teams win challenges and show work hard. On Day 57, it was announced that the runner-up and the third place will received €5,000 divided in different values.

Houseguests

Weekly Tasks

Weekly the contestants did tasks and in the final of each week, the contestants voted in the best and worst workers. In week 7, the best worker did not do a task and the worst did two tasks.
Color Key
 Clean and wash the dishes
 Cut wood
 Prepare the three meals
 Clean the WC, bedroom and kitchen
 Pedaling for bathing
 Wash the clothes of everyone
 Clean coops and rabbit hutches
 Drop and save the animals
 Take eggs and change the straw nests
 Brushing animals
 Clean the barn and stable
 Clean the pigsty
 Milk the cow

Ratings and Reception

Live Eviction Shows

References

External links 
 Official website 
 Fan website, Blue Blog 

Television series by Endemol
The Farm (franchise)
2016 Portuguese television seasons